Accipiter is a genus  of birds of prey in the family Accipitridae. With 51 recognized species it is the most diverse genus in its family. Most species are called goshawks or sparrowhawks, although almost all New World species (excepting the northern goshawk) are simply known as hawks. They can be anatomically distinguished from their relatives by the lack of a procoracoid foramen. Two small and aberrant species usually placed here do possess a large procoracoid foramen and are also distinct as regards DNA sequence. They may warrant separation in the old genus Hieraspiza.

These birds are slender with short, broad, rounded wings and a long tail which helps them maneuver in flight. They have long legs and long, sharp talons used to kill their prey, and a sharp, hooked bill used in feeding. Females tend to be larger than males. They often ambush their prey, mainly small birds and mammals, capturing them after a short chase. The typical flight pattern is a series of flaps followed by a short glide. They are commonly found in wooded or shrubby areas.

The genus Accipiter was introduced by the French zoologist Mathurin Jacques Brisson in 1760 with the  Eurasian sparrowhawk (Accipiter nisus) as the type species.  The name is Latin for "hawk", from accipere, "to grasp".

Procoracoid foramen

The procoracoid foramen (or coracoid foramen, coracoid fenestra) is a hole through the process at the front of the coracoid bone, which accommodates the supracoracoideus nerve.  In some groups of birds it may be present as a notch, or incisura; or the notch may be partially or weakly closed with bone.  In other groups the feature is completely absent.

The foramen is generally present in birds of prey, but it is absent in most Accipiter hawks that have been studied. This absence is proposed as a diagnostic feature.

A study of accipitrid skeletons found procoracoid incisurae (as opposed to foramina) in some specimens of the eagles Aquila gurneyi and A. chrysaetos, but not in four other Aquila species.  The notch was variably open or weakly ossified in Spizastur melanoleucos,  Lophoaetus occipitalis, Spizaetus ornatus, and Stephanoaetus coronatus.  Also the buteonine hawks Buteo brachyurus and B. hemilasius had incisurae, differing from 17 other Buteo species.

In Circus the foramen was found to be variable, not only within species but even between sides in the same individual.  It is usually open or absent but may be closed by "a thread of bone".  Research in genetic phylogeny has since indicated that Circus is closely related to Accipiter.

The notch was also absent or indistinct in Harpagus bidentatus.

Urotriorchis macrourus has a well-developed procoracoid foramen, which suggests a separation from Accipiter.  It may be related to the chanting goshawks in tribe Melieraxini.

Genetic phylogeny

Analysis of molecular genetics indicates that Accipiter is paraphyletic to the Circus harriers, even though the two groups differ in hunting habits and body shape.  There are three or four clades of Accipiter, with Circus, Megatriorchis and Erythrotriorchis intermixed.

John Boyd proposes splitting Accipiter into four separate genera: Aerospiza, Tachyspiza, Accipiter, and Astur.  In this scheme Tachyspiza has the most species, and a reduced Accipiter would have only six: Eurasian sparrowhawk (A. nisus, type species), rufous-breasted sparrowhawk (A. rufiventris), sharp-shinned hawk (A. striatus), white-breasted hawk (A. chionogaster), plain-breasted hawk (A. ventralis), rufous-thighed hawk (A. erythronemius).

 Tribe Accipitrini
 (group 1)
 Erythrotriorchis
 Aerospiza
 Tachyspiza
 (group 2)
 Accipiter
 (group 2a)
 Megatriorchis
 Astur
 Circus
 harriers
 swamp-harriers

List of Accipiter species
There are 49 species in the Accipiter genus.

Extinct species
 Powerful goshawk, Accipiter efficax
 Gracile goshawk, Accipiter quartus

Notes

References

Further reading
 Balete, Danilo S.; Tabaranza, Blas R. Jr. & Heaney, Lawrence R. (2006): An Annotated Checklist of the Birds of Camiguin Island, Philippines. Fieldiana Zool. New Series 106: 58–72. DOI:10.3158/0015-0754(2006)106[58:AACOTB]2.0.CO;2 HTML abstract
 Heaney, Lawrence R. & Tabaranza, Blas R. Jr. (2006): Mammal and Land Bird Studies on Camiguin Island, Philippines: Background and Conservation Priorities. Fieldiana Zool. New Series 106: 1-13. DOI:10.3158/0015-0754(2006)106[1:MALBSO]2.0.CO;2 HTML abstract
 Olson, Storrs L. (2006): Reflections on the systematics of Accipiter and the genus for Falco superciliosus Linnaeus. Bull. B.O.C. 126: 69–70. PDF fulltext. Archived copy.

External links

 Pictures of Accipiters and information about North American Accipiters
 Accipiter Photos

 
Bird genera
True hawks
Taxa named by Mathurin Jacques Brisson